James Stronge may refer to:
Rev. Sir James Stronge, 1st Baronet (1750–1804)
Sir James Stronge, 2nd Baronet (1786–1864), PC
Sir James Stronge, 3rd Baronet (1811–1885), MP for County Armagh 1864–74 
Sir James Stronge, 5th Baronet (1849–1928), PC 1924
James Stronge (Mid-Armagh MP)  (1932–1981), Northern Ireland MP
Sir James Stronge, 10th Baronet (born 1946)

See also
James Strong (disambiguation)